The West Midlands is one of nine official regions of England at the first level of International Territorial Level for statistical purposes. It covers the western half of the area traditionally known as the Midlands. The region consists of the counties of Herefordshire, Shropshire, Staffordshire, Warwickshire, West Midlands and Worcestershire. The region has seven cities; Birmingham, Coventry, Hereford, Lichfield, Stoke-on-Trent, Wolverhampton and Worcester.

The West Midlands region is geographically diverse, from the urban central areas of the West Midlands conurbation to the rural counties of Herefordshire, Shropshire and Worcestershire which border Wales. The region is landlocked. However, the longest river in the UK, the River Severn, traverses the region southeastwards, flowing through the county towns of Shrewsbury and Worcester, and the Ironbridge Gorge, a UNESCO World Heritage Site. Staffordshire is home to the industrialised Potteries conurbation, including the city of Stoke-on-Trent, and the Staffordshire Moorlands area, which borders the southeastern Peak District National Park near Leek. The region also encompasses five Areas of Outstanding Natural Beauty, the Wye Valley, Shropshire Hills, Cannock Chase, Malvern Hills, and parts of the Cotswolds. Warwickshire is home to the towns of Stratford upon Avon, birthplace of writer William Shakespeare, Rugby, the birthplace of Rugby football and Nuneaton, birthplace to author George Eliot.

Geography

The official region contains the ceremonial counties of Herefordshire, Shropshire, Staffordshire, Warwickshire, West Midlands and Worcestershire.

Historic counties

The historic counties ceased to be used for any administrative purpose in 1899 but remain important to some people, notably for county cricket.

There is some confusion in the use of the term "West Midlands", as the name is also used for the much smaller West Midlands county and conurbation which is in the central belt of the Midlands and on the eastern side of the West Midlands Region. It is also still used by various organisations within that area, such as West Midlands Police and West Midlands Fire Service.

The highest point in the region is Black Mountain, at 703 metres (2,307 ft) in west Herefordshire on the border with Powys, Wales.

The region contains five Areas of Outstanding Natural Beauty (AONBs), including the Shropshire Hills, Malvern Hills and Cannock Chase, and parts of the Wye Valley and Cotswolds. The Peak District national park also stretches into the northern corner of Staffordshire.

Towns and cities
Major towns and cities in the West Midlands region include:
Bold indicates city status.

Population > 1,000,000
 Birmingham, WMS
Population > 300,000
 Coventry, WMS
Population > 200,000
 Stoke-on-Trent, STS
 Wolverhampton, WMS
Population > 100,000
 Solihull, WMS
 Sutton Coldfield, WMS
 Telford, SHR
 Worcester, WOR
Population > 50,000
 Burton-upon-Trent, STS
 Dudley, WMS
 Halesowen, WMS
 Hereford, HER
 Kidderminster, WOR
 Leamington Spa, WAR
 Newcastle-under-Lyme, STS
 Nuneaton, WAR
 Redditch, WOR
 Rugby, WAR
 Shrewsbury, SHR
 Smethwick, WMS
 Stafford, STS
 Stourbridge, WMS
 Tamworth, STS
 Walsall, WMS
 West Bromwich, WMS

Population > 25,000
 Aldridge, WMS
 Bedworth, WAR
 Bilston, WMS
 Bloxwich, WMS
 Bromsgrove, WOR 
 Burntwood, STS
 Cannock, STS
 Darlaston, WMS
 Droitwich Spa, WOR
 Evesham, WOR
 Kingswinford, WMS
 Lichfield, STS
 Malvern, WOR
 Oldbury, WMS
 Rowley Regis, WMS
 Stratford-upon-Avon, WAR
 Tipton, WMS
 Warwick, WAR
 Wednesbury, WMS
 Willenhall, WMS

Population > 10,000
 Atherstone, WAR
 Biddulph, STS
 Brierley Hill, WMS
 Bridgnorth, SHR
 Cheadle, STS
 Hednesford. STS
 Kenilworth, WAR
 Kidsgrove, STS
 Leek, STS
 Leominster, HER
 Ludlow, SHR
 Market Drayton, SHR
 Newport, SHR
 Oswestry, SHR
 Ross-on-Wye, HER
 Rugeley, STS
 Sedgley, WMS
 Stone, STS
 Stourport-on-Severn, WOR
 Uttoxeter, STS
 Whitnash, WAR
 Wombourne, STS

Urban areas
The West Midlands region contains several urban areas with populations of 100,000 or more in 2021, which include:

West Midlands conurbation (includes Birmingham, Wolverhampton, Solihull, Sutton Coldfield, Dudley, West Bromwich and Walsall.) (Pop: 2,594,803)
Coventry and Bedworth urban area (includes Coventry, Bedworth and Binley Woods.) (Pop: 389,603)
Stoke-on-Trent built-up area {includes Stoke-on-Trent, Newcastle-under-Lyme and Kidsgrove) (Pop: 382,687)
Telford (Pop: 161,170)
Worcester (Pop: 107,082)
Royal Leamington Spa Built-up area (includes Leamington Spa, Warwick, Whitnash, Cubbington) (pop: 102,972)
Nuneaton built-up area (includes Nuneaton, Bulkington, Hartshill} (pop: 100,710)

Modern history

Second World War
The RAF Fauld explosion on 27 November 1944 in east Staffordshire produced a 100-foot deep crater, and is the UK's largest explosion, being caused by around 4,000 tonnes of high explosive, and may be the world's largest non-nuclear explosion.

Birmingham was the third most bombed city in the UK after London and Liverpool; Spitfires were built in Castle Bromwich, Lancasters at Austin's works in Longbridge at Cofton Hackett, and the Birmingham Small Arms Company at Small Heath produced the M1919 Browning machine gun. Boulton Paul Aircraft had their main aircraft factory in the north of Wolverhampton. RAF Defford, in the south of Worcestershire between Pershore and Croome Park, was where many important airborne radars were developed, such as H2S (radar) and anti-submarine radars.

Scientific heritage
Thomas Wedgwood, son of Josiah Wedgwood, discovered the first photo-sensitive (light-sensitive) chemicals – silver nitrate and silver chloride in the 1790s.

Sir Norman Lockyer of Rugby discovered helium in 1868, for which he used electromagnetic spectroscopy.

Edward Weston of Oswestry, who emigrated to the US, built the first accurate voltmeter in the late 1880s, and the Weston cell in 1893.

Francis W. Aston of Harborne, educated at the University of Birmingham, developed mass spectrometry in 1919, which helped him to identify the first isotopes, receiving the Nobel Prize for Chemistry in 1922.

Dennis Gabor invented holography at British Thomson-Houston in Rugby in 1947, receiving the Nobel Prize for Physics in 1971.

James Glaisher in 1862 took a record balloon flight with Henry Tracey Coxwell for the BAAS near Wolverhampton. They reached  the composition of the Earth's atmosphere until then was not understood; the altitude records for the UK have not been exceeded since; Project Excelsior in the US in 1960 would later reach .

Philip Lawley of Burton upon Trent was first person to realise that chemical damage to DNA caused cancer (at the Chester Beatty Research Institute in London) in the early 1960s.

Francis Galton (d. 1911) of the Darwin–Wedgwood family's Birmingham branch was an early eugenicist rooted in improving animal breeding stock and examining heredity. He invented terms eugenics and nature versus nurture. His limited calls for human eugenics were widened by the German Society for Racial Hygiene in 1905 founded by Alfred Ploetz, which coupled with the racial superiority fallacies of Aryanism reached its nadir in genocidal anti-semitism. Moral teachings and inherent repulsions towards human eugenics were overcome by a minority of those in power espousing racial equality; European media and leaders lamented loss of Empire, advocated ultranationalism and prized military physical advantage; Galton saw human eugenics as part of all means to do better.

Industrial heritage

Much of the Industrial revolution in the United Kingdom began in Birmingham and the Black Country area of West Midlands. The Industrial Revolution is thought to have begun when Abraham Darby substituted coke in the place of charcoal to smelt iron, at his Old Furnace. The Black Country may be regarded as the world's first industrial landscape, while nearby Ironbridge Gorge claims to be the Birthplace of Industry. The world's first cast iron bridge in 1779 spans the Gorge. The first self-propelled locomotive to run on rails in 1803 at Coalbrookdale, was built by Richard Trevithick. The first iron rails for horse-drawn transport, were made at Coalbrookdale in 1768 by Richard Reynolds at Ketley Ironworks. Iron rails only became widely successful in 1820 when made out of wrought iron at Bedlington Ironworks in north-east England.

 
Birmingham's industrial development was triggered by discussions at the Lunar Society of Birmingham at Soho House, Boulton's house, and products were carried along the BCN Main Line canal. Soho Manufactory was the first man-made-powered factory in world. Chance Brothers of Smethwick built the glass for The Crystal Palace in 1851. Smethwick Engine, now at Thinktank, Birmingham Science Museum, is the oldest working steam engine, made in 1779, and is the oldest working engine in the world. Smethwick was a main centre for making lighthouse lanterns.

Valor Fires in Erdington developed the first radiant gas fire in 1967, a balanced flue fire in 1973, and a natural flame gas fire in 1978. The Erdington site, owned by Iceland's BDR Thermea, closed in May 2012. The company also built gas cookers; since 2011 the company has been part of Glen Dimplex, who have a site at Cooper's Bank, south of Gornalwood.

Ditherington Flax Mill in Shrewsbury was the first iron-framed building in the world in 1797. Thomas Bolton & Sons of Froghall, Staffordshire, made the world's first transatlantic telegraph cable in 1857, having supplied a submarine cable across the English Channel in 1850. On 10 July 1890, a trunk circuit telephone line was opened between London and Birmingham by the National Telephone Company; for the first time this allowed phone calls between the London and the north. The world's first coaxial cable was laid between London and Birmingham in 1936 to give 40 channels for telephone traffic. and brought into use in 1938, later extended to Manchester in 1940.

Alexander Parkes invented the first man-made plastic (thermoplastic) in Birmingham in 1856. Princess Square, Wolverhampton, was the site of Britain's first traffic lights in 1927. Infrared cameras were developed at the Royal Radar Establishment in Malvern (with EMI Electronics) in 1967. The world's first Maglev train operated at Birmingham Airport in 1983. The tallest freestanding structure in the region was the chimney of Ironbridge power station at 673 ft. John Baskerville of Birmingham, a former stone carver, largely invented fonts, or typefaces, for printing.

Much of the UK's car industry would be centred in Coventry and Birmingham; most of this has now gone. Midland Motor Cylinder (part of Birmid Industries) of Smethwick was the largest producer of automobile cylinder blocks in Europe. Fort Dunlop was Europe's largest tyre plant. Metro-Cammell in Birmingham made most of the 1970s and 1980s London Underground trains. MG Rover (a company of Rover) closed in 2005 (from 1885), The Ryton plant, which made the Peugeot 206, closed at the end of 2006, with production moving to Trnava in Slovakia, and some to a plant at Kolín in the Czech Republic. Alfred Herbert of Coventry was the largest machine-tool manufacturer in the UK for many decades; it was brought down in the 1970s by advancing technology overseas, and complacent strategic decisions of the management, finally closing in 1982; many Midlands manufacturing companies followed similar fates in the 1970s and 1980s.

Henry Wiggin & Co of Hereford developed the metal alloys necessary for other Midlands' (and beyond) automotive and aerospace companies – Inconel, Incoloy and Nimonic. It was the lack of vanadium for high-melting point alloys, caused by Royal Navy action, that prevented German Me 262 engines being serviceable; had German Second World War engineers had a greater supply of vanadium and molybdenum, the engine life (around 12 hours maximum, from entering service in April 1944 to the end of the war) of their jet engine would have increased much more, which would have been significant to the war's outcome. Bristol Siddeley developed the rocket engines for Black Arrow at Ansty; in fact all of R-R's rocket engines were developed and built there at R-R's Industrial and Marine Gas Turbine Division; Britain's smaller rocket engines for missiles were built by Bristol Aerojet in what is now North Somerset. High Duty Alloys at Redditch constructed (forged) the compressor and turbine blades for Whittle's first engines, and many of the early jet engines; it made Concorde's airframe from the Hiduminium R.R.58 aluminium alloy.

Maxaret, the world's first ABS braking system, was invented in Coventry by Dunlop in the early 1950s for aircraft; John Boyd Dunlop was a Scottish vet who had first produced the first pneumatic tyres in 1889. Matthew Piers Watt Boulton, grandson of Matthew Boulton, and born in the area, invented the aileron, an important flight control surface in 1868, decades before the first actual flight. Triumph Engineering was a famous motorbike firm in Meriden. About a quarter of all British WWI planes were built in Coventry. The Jensen Interceptor FF was the first production four-wheel-drive car in the world, designed by Major Tony Rolt, and built at their factory in West Bromwich.

Cadbury launched Dairy Milk in 1905, Bournville in 1906, Fruit & Nut in 1928, Whole Nut in 1930, Cadbury Roses in 1938, and the Cadbury Creme Egg in 1971. George and Richard Cadbury built their factory in 1879 and Bournville in 1893, named after the Bourn brook. Iceland (supermarket) opened its first store in Oswestry in 1970 – heralding the onset of frozen food in the UK. Alfred Bird invented egg-free custard in 1837 in Birmingham – accidentally given to guests at his home, being created as his wife had an allergy to eggs; he then invented baking powder in 1843 as his wife also had an allergy to yeast.

Culture
J. R. R. Tolkien grew up in Birmingham, Kings Heath, then part of Worcestershire, and was inspired by Moseley Bog and Sarehole, and perhaps by the Perrott's Folly. Philip Larkin came from Coventry. Rowland Hill (stamps) was from Kidderminster. The writer George Eliot came from Nuneaton. Anthony E. Pratt from Birmingham invented Cluedo.

Frederick Gibberd of Coventry designed Liverpool Metropolitan Cathedral. Edward Cave from Rugby made Britain's first magazine in 1731 – The Gentleman's Magazine. Philip Astley from Newcastle-under-Lyme invented the modern day circus in 1768 – Astley's Amphitheatre.

The Castlemorton Common Festival in May 1992 near Malvern, led to the Criminal Justice and Public Order Act 1994.

The Nowka Bais is a Bengali boat racing festival which takes place annually in Birmingham. It is a cultural event in the West Midlands, United Kingdom attracting not only the Bangladeshi diaspora but a variety of cultures. It is also the largest kind of boat race in the United Kingdom.

Regional assembly

The official representative body of the region is the West Midlands Leaders Board which has limited administrative functions such as regional planning and economic development. The board is not an elected body, but is made up of members appointed from local councils across the region and is known as a quango. It is based on Edward Street in Birmingham, near the National Indoor Arena. From March 2010, the funding decisions at regional level were taken over by Advantage West Midlands, the Regional Development Agency.

Demographics

Ethnicity

The West Midlands is the second most ethnically diverse region of the UK (London being the most diverse). This is in large part due to the West Midlands conurbation, which is highly diverse. The ethnic makeup of the West Midlands as a whole as measured by the 2011 census was as follows:

Teenage pregnancy
For top-tier authorities in the West Midlands, Stoke-on-Trent has the highest teenage pregnancy rate. For council districts, Nuneaton and Bedworth in Warwickshire has the highest rate closely followed by Tamworth. For top-tier authorities, Shropshire has the lowest rate, and for council districts Malvern Hills has the lowest rate.

Social deprivation
The region, from studies of multiple deprivation, shows similarities with Yorkshire and the Humber, and is more deprived than the neighbouring East Midlands. From the Indices of deprivation 2007, it can be seen that, in common with Northern England, the region has more Lower Area Super Output Areas in the 20% most deprived districts than in the 20% least deprived districts. The region's most deprived council districts, in descending order, are Birmingham (10th highest in England), Sandwell (14th), Stoke-on-Trent (16th), Wolverhampton (28th), Walsall (45th), Coventry (61st), and Dudley (100th).

The least deprived districts in 2007 (before Shropshire became a unitary authority in 2009) were Bromsgrove, South Staffordshire, Warwick, Wychavon, and Lichfield. At county level, the least deprived areas, in descending order, were Warwickshire, Worcestershire, Solihull, Staffordshire, and Shropshire.

In March 2011 the region had the second highest overall unemployment claimant count in England at 4.7%, second to North East England. The highest in the region was Wolverhampton at 7.7%, the joint second highest (with Manchester) unemployment rate in England. Next is Sandwell with 7.1%, Birmingham with 7.0%, and Walsall with 6.4%. The lowest rate in the region is the district of Stratford-on-Avon, with 1.6% – one of the lowest unemployment rates in England.

Politics

Elections

In the 1992 general election, Nuneaton was taken by Labour with a 7% swing, which was one of the largest swings of the night; in the 2015 election, the Nuneaton result would largely seal the eventual outcome of the election. In the 2010 general election, North Warwickshire (Dan Byles) had the smallest Conservative majority, with 54; Stoke-on-Trent Central had the smallest number of winning votes, with 12,220.

In the 2015 general election, the Conservatives gained the largest share of the region by popular vote and took control of the number of seats, with 42% of the region's electorate voting Conservative, 33% Labour, 16% UKIP, 6% Liberal Democrat and 3% Green. The Conservatives gained 2 seats with virtually no swing from Labour to Conservative.

In the 2017 general election, South Staffordshire (Gavin Williamson) had the second-highest Conservative vote proportion in the UK – 69.8%. David Firth, at the University of Warwick, invented the BBC election exit poll. 6 ft 9 Daniel Kawczynski, a Shropshire MP, is the tallest MP ever.

Although having a slightly smaller percentage of the vote than the neighbouring East Midlands, the geographic area of the West Midlands is more Conservative, due to Labour's vote now consigned to the urban areas of Birmingham, Coventry and Stoke-on-Trent. The number of seats is more favoured towards Labour than the geographic spread, with 35 Conservative seats and 24 Labour. All of Warwickshire, Staffordshire, Herefordshire, Worcestershire and Shropshire is now Conservative.

Political parties
The Green Party of England and Wales was formed at the Bridge Inn in Napton-on-the-Hill, Warwickshire, in February 1973, originating from an article by Paul R. Ehrlich about population growth in Playboy magazine. In 1975, it became the Ecology Party and then the Green Party in 1985.

Eurostat NUTS
In the Eurostat Nomenclature of Territorial Units for Statistics (NUTS), the West Midlands form a level-1 NUTS region, coded "UKG", which is subdivided as follows:

Local government
The region consists of the following administrative subdivisions:

Key: †two-tier non-metropolitan county  |  *metropolitan county including the West Midlands Combined Authority and mayor

Demography

The West Midlands' population accounts for almost 11% of England's overall population. 49.36% of the region's population resides in the West Midlands county, 20.17% in Staffordshire, 10.49% in Worcestershire, 9.91% in Warwickshire, 8.56% in Shropshire, and 3.37% in Herefordshire.

Economy
Business Link West Midlands was based on the Quinton Business Park in Quinton, next to Highways England. NHS West Midlands, the strategic health authority was in Edgbaston. The West Midlands Ambulance Service is in Brierley Hill, near the headquarters of West Midlands Police, where the Child Support Agency (CSA) was headquartered. The region's Manufacturing Advisory Service was on Wolverhampton Science Park, north of the city centre; this function is now represented by Made in the Midlands, north of Wolverhampton.

The DIT West Midlands for the region is based at the West Midlands Chambers of Commerce on Harborne Road, south of NHS West Midlands west of Five Ways. Most of the region is covered by the Midlands Air Ambulance, except Warwickshire is covered by the Warwickshire & Northamptonshire Air Ambulance, based at Coventry Airport; both are charity-funded. Sir Anthony Bamford of Staffordshire is the richest British industrialist, at around £3.15bn in 2014; Sir James Dyson is second (£3bn).

Herefordshire

Bulmers Cider in Hereford is the world's largest cider factory, and has the world's largest vat (for Strongbow), built in 1975. Painter Brothers (part of Balfour Beatty) in the north of Hereford, is the UK's largest manufacturer of electricity pylons (transmission towers), broadcasting masts, the Callender-Hamilton bridge, and rail electrification structures. Special Metals Wiggin, part of Special Metals Corporation, based at Hereford was the main producer of nickel alloys in Europe, with a large site directly north of Painter Brothers. Cargill Meats Europe (formerly Sun Valley) have a large poultry meat processing facility, processing chickens from around Herefordshire.

Cadbury (Mondelēz International) make milk chocolate crumb near Marlbrook (near Leominster). Weston's Cider is in Much Marcle, who also make Stowford Press.  Wye Fruit Ltd is in the north of Ledbury on the B4214 and is a large site of Amcor, and further west is Universal Beverages (UBL), owned by Heineken since 2007 where it cans cider. The site of Ledbury Preserves of RHM made Robertson's jam, mincemeat and marmalade and closed in 2008 when production moved to Cambridgeshire. Holden Aluminium Technologies are a sports car chassis manufacturer at Linton. Kingspan Insulation is based at Pembridge.  BT's Madley Communications Centre, claims to be the world's largest earth station. Tyrrells Potato Crisps are at Dilwyn west of Leominster.

Shropshire

Rayburn Range and Aga Rangemaster Group are based in Telford; the PDSA is in St George's and Priorslee, Telford. The MoD have a significant depot at Lilleshall and Donnington.  There are also high-technology industries such as Unimation, Nikon, Hitachi Maxell, Ricoh, Capgemini, Fujitsu and Electronic Data Systems.  In Hadley Castle, Denso Manufacturing UK Ltd make car air-conditioning systems and GKN Wheels make car wheels. Makita Manufacturing Europe at Hortonwood, Telford is the only plant in the UK that makes power tools.

Müller Dairy Ltd is based in Market Drayton, and Palethorpes, part of Pork Farms which makes own-label sausages. At Crudgington, Dairy Crest made Country Life butter and Clover until February 2015, and have their Technical Centre. Anglo Beef Processors (ABP Food Group) are at Harlescott in the north of Shrewsbury. Uniq plc have a plant at Minsterley and make chilled desserts for Tesco.

BT have their National Network Management Centre (Whittington House) in Whittington, Shropshire. Military helicopter training in the UK takes place at RAF Shawbury, alongside training for the RAF's air traffic controllers (ATC).

Staffordshire

The brewing companies such as Coors Brewers are in Burton on Trent, as well as Marmite, Marston's Brewery, GNC UK (health supplements). Branston is the original home of Branston Pickle, where the original factory can still be seen on Burton Road. Spirit Pub Company is near the A5121/A38 junction, with Punch Taverns slightly further north.

Newell Rubbermaid UK (owner of Parker Pen, Berol, Paper Mate and DYMO), a large RDC of Tesco, and Zytek (motorsport) is at Fradley Park, on an old airfield. Norgren was an international pneumatic technology company on Eastern Avenue, Lichfield.

Michelin Tyres are made at Sideway in Stoke-on-Trent. Royal Doulton and Wedgwood were/are based at Burslem and Barlaston respectively. Portmeirion Pottery, which owns the Royal Worcester brand, is in Stoke. Steelite International (pottery) is based at Middleport, in west Burslem, next to the Trent and Mersey Canal. Wade Ceramics is at Etruria to the east of Wolstanton, near the HQ of The Sentinel newspaper (Harmsworth Printing). Premier Foods make Mr Kipling slices and Cherry Bakewells at Trent Vale in the south of Stoke-on-Trent.

Bet365 is situated at Festival Park in Etruria, and is Stoke-on-Trent's largest private sector employer. Dechra Pharmaceuticals makes veterinary pharmaceuticals at Talke. Churchill China is at Sandyford near Tunstall. Sumitomo Electrical Wiring Systems (Europe), which supplies wiring for the automotive industry, is at Silverdale. At Kidsgrove, Converteam make variable speed drives (VSDs); AAH Pharmaceuticals has its Enterprise and Trident divisions in Talke, in the west of Kidsgrove. Andritz UK is at Wolstanton, in the north of Newcastle.

Mann+Hummel UK, at Featherstone, make air and oil filters. Armitage Shanks (owned by Ideal Standard International) is to the east of Rugeley in Armitage with Handsacre; JCB Cab Systems was next to the A51 on the Riverside Industrial Estate. The UK headquarters of GE Grid Solutions is based at Stafford as well as a factory and the UK headquarters of Bostikon Common Road, in the north of the town.

Numark Pharmacy is at Tamworth. Bristan based in Dordon and Baddesley Ensor on the Birch Coppice Business Park south-west of Tamworth, next to a new Ocado distribution centre, is the UK's largest supplier of kitchen and bathroom taps; Volkswagen Group (VAG UK) have their main UK distribution facility there, the site of Birch Coppice Colliery before 1987. Ansell UK (medical gloves, from Australia) is on Tamworth Enterprise Park. Whittington Barracks (DMS Whittington) near to the west is the home of the Defence Medical Services, Defence Dental Service, and the Defence Medical Services Training Centre.

Premier Foods make Bird's Custard, Angel Delight and Marvel powdered milk in Knighton, west of Eccleshall near the Shropshire boundary. Ornua, best known for the Kerrygold brand, have a large cheese production site in Leek on Sunnyhills Road.

Warwickshire
Volvo Trucks UK and a large data centre of IBM are in Warwick. Godiva are the UK's leading manufacturer of fire pumps in Emscote, east Warwick. On the Warwick Technology Park, south of Warwick, are Phillips 66 UK who own JET UK (petrol); to the east is McKesson's European HQ (who produce the software for the NHS's 1.4 million employees' payroll – the largest payroll in the UK), and to the west is Tulip (who produce SPAM) and are owned by Danish Crown Group – Europe's largest pork producer.

The British Horse Society is in Kenilworth. At Cubbington is the UK headquarters of Joma, and has the Thwaites dumper manufacturer.

BMW have their main European four-cylinder engine plant at Hams Hall. Subaru UK and Isuzu UK (IM Group) are at the Coleshill Manor Office Campus, west of Coleshill. TNT UK and Aldi UK is in the west of Atherstone; Aldi opened its first UK store on 17 July 1990 in Stechford, Birmingham, and now has around 700 UK stores. 3M have an abrasive products factory in the east of the town. Holland & Barrett are Europe's largest health food chain, with 1,400 stores. Triton Showers (the UK's largest shower company) are based in Nuneaton.

South of Nuneaton, is the national distribution centre of Dairy Crest, where it also packages Cathedral City cheese. The London congestion charge is operated by Capita, based at Prologis Park in the west of Exhall. Rolls-Royce have a large engine overhaul plant near Ansty in Coombe Fields, which also makes their engine casings.

Aston Martin and Land Rover have their headquarters in Gaydon. Nearby to the south is MoD Kineton (former Defence Storage and Distribution Agency or DSDA Kineton, now part of Defence Equipment and Support or DE&S), home of the Army School of Ammunition and Defence Explosive Ordnance Disposal, Munitions and Search Training Regiment which teaches bomb disposal.

GE Power Conversion UK and Morgan Sindall Construction & Infrastructure are in Rugby. Alstom have their Power and Transport division in the north of Rugby, where they service steam turbines. On the Swift Valley Ind Estate, Premier Foods have their national distribution centre. The European HQ of Gap is in the north of Rugby; Gap is the world's third-biggest fashion retailer, with 118 stores in the UK. CEMEX have the country's largest cement works, west of Rugby.

West Midlands county

In Central Birmingham
The Insolvency Service's Intelligence and Enforcement Directorate.
Stamp Duty Land Tax and stamp duty on shares
National Debtline
The Solicitors Regulation Authority
H. Samuel, jewellers.
J Hudson & Co the world's largest producer of whistles make Acme Whistles.
National Express and CrossCountry in transport.

Car manufacturers

Land Rover main factory
Jaguar Cars, Peugeot UK and Citroen UK & Ireland have a large manufacturing plant at Castle Bromwich Assembly making the XJ, XF and XK.

Nearest Birmingham

Cadbury's main plant and Cadbury World remains in Bournville, Birmingham; since 2012.
B Mason & Sons produce rolled copper and cupronickel alloy precision strips; applications include submarine communication cables.
Kiepe Electric UK (former Vossloh-Kiepe)
Goodyear Tyres
Dunlop Aircraft Tyres manufacture and retread 
Claire's (accessories) European head office is at Erdington.
Royal Society for the Prevention of Accidents in training, surveying and policy advice.

Outskirts of County
HiQ, tyre merchants.
UK Mail
Genting Group UK casinos
Dana Traction Technologies make axles (including that of the Ford Transit and Range Rover).
TIMET UK. 
Goodrich Engine Controls make engine control systems for jet engines
Pilkington Automotive make Triplex Safety Glass
Alcoa plant
Small-scale production of MG by Nanjing Automobile Group on part of the former MG Rover Group site
Schaeffler Group UK (inc. INA) make timing belts and wheel bearings) for wind turbines, passenger cars and aircraft
The Works (retailer) distribution centre, books, puzzles, toys and games 
The Defence Infrastructure Organisation (former Defence Estates)
Eaton Electric make residual-current devices 
Highways England National Traffic Control Centre 
Ishida Europe makes industrial multihead weighers and food processing equipment
Aisin Europe Manufacturing
Keiper UK automotive seating

Near other main towns
Severn Trent (water)
Saint-Gobain UK is based at Binley Business Park.
Coventry Building Society nearby Jewson, is in the east of the city at Binley. 
Chartered Institute of Housing
RICS UK
Bladon Jets develop micro gas turbines and were the first to develop an axial flow micro example in 1994.
Halfords Autocentre
Axeon UK distributes lithium-ion batteries

Morgan Advanced Materials Composites and Defence Systems, make the British Army's helmet – the Mk 7 helmet and electronics for the Cougar MRAP, as well as body armour for the police.
Bystronic UK makes laser cutting equipment
Stadco UK design division
The Education and Skills Funding Agency, and National Apprenticeship Service. 
AAH Pharmaceuticals and Lloyds Pharmacy, owned by Celesio.
Sainsbury's: TU clothing distribution.
British Chambers of Commerce, a representative and awards-giving corporate membership organisation. 
Walkers (snack foods) within their corn and wheat products ranges
Gefco UK (owned by Peugeot); 
Co-op National Distribution Centre for the bulk of England

The Forensic Science Service, Linpac, Lafarge Cement UK and IMI plc are on the Birmingham Business Park in Bickenhill. The National Exhibition Centre (NEC) is just north. ZF Lemförder UK's site at Bickenhill makes axle modules for Land Rover. Newey and Eyre, Britain's largest electrical wholesaler, is at Sheldon. Neopost UK is off the A452. Goodrich UK is in Shirley. TRW Conekt have a main automotive engineering research centre at The Green Business Park in Shirley Heath. The Mormons (Latter Day Saints) have their European HQ in Solihull.

The UK's VAT Registration Service, for Value Added Tax is at HMRC in Wolverhampton. Flint Ink UK in the east of the town centre, was the largest ink supplier in the British Empire, before being bought in 1998.

Turner Powertrain Systems is the world market leader for transmissions for backhoe loaders, mini excavators telescopic handlers, and site dumpers is further south, near Dunstall Hill. Tata Steel (former site of British Steel Seamless Tubes until 1995) have their Wednesfield Steelpark (the UK's biggest steelyard, built by Corus in 1999) on the Walsall boundary.

Essar Steel UK in west Dudley, is the largest independent steel toll processor in the UK.

Hadley Group near the Soho Foundry is the largest cold roll forming manufacturer in the UK. Caparo Precision Tubes in Oldbury, is the UK's largest producer of electric resistance welded (ERW) steel tubes, and Wellman Group make boilers to the west. Metsec, east of Oldbury, is one of the UK's largest cold roll-forming companies. The AA have a main office in Rounds Green, west of Oldbury. BIP Chemicals (former British Cyanides) at Oldbury are the oldest polymer manufacturer in the UK. 2 Sisters Food Group, Britain's largest processor of chicken, is based in the West Midlands.

The national headquarters of One Stop is in Brownhills, at Clayhanger. Poundland is in Willenhall. Wedge Group, based in Willenhall, is the largest hot dip galvanising company in the UK. Assa Abloy UK (and Yale UK, former Yale & Towne), is also in Willenhall, as the town is known for manufacture of locks. A.F. Blakemore, supplies most of the SPAR shops in the UK.

Worcestershire

In Redditch are Halfords, to the south in Washford, and GKN (it has the second largest turnover in the West Midlands) is in Riverside. Mettis Aerospace are in Enfield, north Redditch, and make light metal components ( former High Duty Alloys, which made most of the forged pistons for Britain's aircraft engines in WWII). Phoenix Group (non-public life assurance schemes) is in the north-east of the county near the Warwickshire boundary, at Wythall, and has a large turnover; nearby to west Metalrax, headquartered in Alvechurch, make (via subsidiaries) most of the bakeware sold in the UK.

Roger Dyson Group manufactures auto-recovery vehicles in north Droitwich. South of Bromsgrove, L.G. Harris & Co make paintbrushes. Lea & Perrins is in Worcester. Joy Mining Machinery are in the west of Worcester. Worcester, Bosch Group make 1,200 boilers a day. Mazak UK have the parent company's European manufacturing facility (for CNC machine tools) in the north of Worcester. Nearby on the Blackpole Ind Est, Froude Hofmann have their world headquarters, who make dynamometers.

Roxel UK develops solid-fuel rockets for missiles south of Kidderminster and in Hartlebury. The West Midland Safari Park is in Bewdley, west of Kidderminster. Morgan Technical Ceramics is headquartered at Lickhill in Stourport-on-Severn. Egbert H. Taylor in Elmley Lovett, near Hartlebury is a manufacturer of metal bins.

Liquid crystal displays were developed in 1972 in conjunction with the Royal Radar Establishment, where Geoffrey Dummer invented the idea of the integrated circuit in 1952. It was based in Malvern, and became the Royal Signals and Radar Establishment, which developed thermal imaging and pyroelectric infrared detectors, and is now a large site owned by QinetiQ. Morgan Motor Company is in Malvern Link. Commsoft RMS is in Evesham. For many years Group 4 Security, which was the largest security company in Europe, had its headquarters in Broadway, on the edge of the Cotswolds; G4S Integrated Services now has its HQ there.

Education

Secondary education
Selective schools are in low numbers as follows: Birmingham (8), Walsall (2), Wolverhampton (1), Warwickshire (6), Stoke-on-Trent (1), and Telford and Wrekin (2). The highest proportion per head therefore is Warwickshire (its population is between 550,000 and 600,000 people). The other counties and metropolitan boroughs have none, their public education systems are comprehensive in intake. The grammar and independent schools tend to produce pass-rate examination results among the top twenty ranked regionally. Many pupils compete for entrance examinations to attend such long-established Grammar Schools and most have significant parent sponsorship. In 2016 two of the top ten such schools nationally were in Warwickshire, where in the CV37 postal district prices were 34% higher than the county as a whole.

Around 275,000 secondary schools are in the region, the greatest number after the South East, Greater London and North West.

At GCSE based on % of entrants' pass rates, the best performing local government area in 2010 was Solihull, closely followed by Warwickshire and Shropshire. Dudley, Herefordshire, Telford and Wrekin, Birmingham and Staffordshire (in descending order) are above the English average, at which rate, is approximately Worcestershire. The area consistently having fewest passes is Sandwell, followed by Stoke-on-Trent.  Struggling pupils in Wolverhampton and Walsall also attain fewer passes than the English average in most GCSE years, sometimes by a very narrow margin.  For metropolitan boroughs, Solihull then Dudley perform best. Dudley is the best metropolitan borough at A-level passes and has a consistent post-2000 history of being better than Solihull.

According to The Guardian, schools have been off-rolling pupils. Pupils likely to perform poorly in examinations are expelled before the examinations to improve the school performance in league tables. Expelled pupils then disproportionately get involved in gangs and in crime. Knife crime in the West Midlands is the highest outside London.

In 2010, regionally in persistent truancy at secondary school, Sandwell had the highest rate at 6.9%; Bromsgrove had the lowest at 2.3%.

Tertiary education
There are thirty-seven FE colleges (FECs). There are six LSCs for the area (which fund FECs), and the Learning and Skills Council head office is based in Coventry. The five largest FE colleges in the region – Bournville College, North Warwickshire and Hinckley College, Solihull College, South & City College Birmingham and Stoke-on-Trent College – each have more than 25,000 students.

School children in Shropshire and Solihull are most likely to attend university, followed by Herefordshire, Worcestershire and Warwickshire.

School league tables
Below is a list of the top twenty state schools in the West Midlands by 2010 A level results:
 1. King Edward VI Camp Hill School for Girls, Kings Heath (1212)
 2. Sutton Coldfield Grammar School for Girls
 3. King Edward VI Five Ways, Bartley Green
 4. King Edward VI Camp Hill School for Boys, Kings Heath
 5. Stratford-upon-Avon Grammar School for Girls
 6. Queen Mary's Grammar School, Walsall
 7. King Edward VI College, Stourbridge
 8. Newport Girls High School
 9. King Edward VI Handsworth
 10. King Edward VI School, Stratford-upon-Avon
 11. King Edward VI Aston
 12. Bishop Vesey's Grammar School, Sutton Coldfield
 13. Wolverhampton Girls' High School
 14. Thomas Telford School, Telford
 15. St. Joseph's College, Stoke-on-Trent
 16. Queen Mary's High School, Walsall
 17. Rugby High School for Girls
 18. St Augustine's High School, Redditch
 19. Hereford Sixth Form College
 20. Moorlands Sixth Form College, Cheadle, Staffordshire

Universities

The University of Birmingham is the main university in the region and has the most funding. It has a large research grant, as does the University of Warwick, which is the next largest in terms of funding. Birmingham and Warwick are members of the Russell Group of public research universities. Keele and Aston have a moderate research grant, but none of the other universities do. Keele, although having the largest campus in the UK (by area), is one of the smallest universities in the region. There are medical schools at Warwick, Keele and Birmingham. Birmingham and Warwick receive more than twice as much total income than any other university in the region – around £400 million each.

Around 45% of students are from the region, and 35% from other parts of the UK, while 20% are from overseas.  The region attracts students from South East England owing to good access via the M40 and the West Coast Main Line, but there is a good mix from other regions too, except the North East (especially) and Yorkshire.  Students native to the West Midlands are most likely to study in the region (40%), then the East Midlands (12%), the North West (11%), and then Yorkshire (9%). Very few go to the East of England or the North East. The region has a net export of university students to other regions.

At time of graduation in 2010 almost 60% of graduates remained in the West Midlands, with 10% going to London, 7% to the South-East, and around 5% to the East Midlands. Very few go to Yorkshire, the North-East, or even (neighbouring) Wales.

Transport

Railways

Served by many lines in the urban areas such as the West Coast Main Line and branches.  The Welsh Marches Line and the Cotswold Line transect the region as well as the Cross Country Route and Chiltern Line. There are plans to reopen the Gloucestershire Warwickshire Railway.  The HS2 (High Speed Two) project is planned to connect London to Birmingham by 2026.

Road

Several notable roads pass through the region, with most converging around the central conurbation. The M5, which connects South West England to the region, passes through Worcestershire, near to Worcester, and through the West Midlands county, past West Bromwich, with its northern terminus at its junction with the M6 just south of Walsall. The M6, which has its southern terminus just outside the southeast of the region at its junction with the M1, and which connects the region to North West England, passes Rugby and Nuneaton in Warwickshire, Coventry and Birmingham, and Stafford and Stoke-on-Trent in Staffordshire. The M6 toll provides an alternative route to the M6 between Coleshill and Cannock, passing north of Sutton Coldfield and just south of Lichfield. 

The M40 connects the region through South East England to London, with its northern terminus at its junction with the M42; it passes close to Warwick and Banbury. The M42 connects the M5 at Bromsgrove, passing around the south and east of Birmingham, joining the M40 and M6, passing Solihull and Castle Bromwich, to Tamworth, northeast of Birmingham.  The M50 connects the M5 from near Tewkesbury to Ross-on-Wye in the southwest. The M54 connects Wellington in the west, passing Telford, to the M6 near Cannock. The A5 road traverses the region northwest–southeast, passing through Shrewsbury, Telford, Cannock, Tamworth and Nuneaton.

The longest elevated road viaduct in the UK is the  section from Gravelly Hill to Castle Bromwich on the M6, opened on 24 May 1972; the  Bromford Viaduct is the longest viaduct in the UK. The section of the A45 in Coventry from Willenhall to Allesley in 1939 was one of the UK's first ever large planned road schemes; road schemes on that scale had not been previously built, with few large road schemes outside of London, or were piecemeal.

Princes Square in Wolverhampton had Britain's first automatic traffic lights on 5 November 1927. On 13 January 2012, 34-year-old Ben Westwood of Wednesfield, was caught by the police, when speeding at 180 mph, in an Audi RS5 with a Lamborghini engine, from Wolverhampton up to Stafford on the M6, and back again. He was travelling so fast that he was outpacing the Central Counties Air Operations Unit Eurocopter helicopter. He and the vehicle had been in fifteen smash and grab raids and he was jailed for nine years at Wolverhampton Crown Court in August 2012.

Transport policy
As part of the transport planning system, the Regional Assembly is under statutory requirement to produce a regional transport strategy (RTS) to provide long term planning for transport in the region. This involves region-wide transport schemes such as those carried out by Highways England and Network Rail.

Within the region, the local transport authorities carry out transport planning through the use of a local transport plan (LTP) which outlines their strategies, policies and implementation programme. The most recent LTP is that for the period 2006–11. In the West Midlands region, the following transport authorities have published their LTP online: Herefordshire, Shropshire U.A., Staffordshire, Telford and Wrekin U.A., Warwickshire, West Midlands and Worcestershire. The transport authority of Stoke-on-Trent U.A. publishes a joint local transport plan in partnership with Staffordshire County Council to cover the North Staffordshire Major Urban Area, which includes Stoke-on-Trent and the more urban parts of Newcastle-under-Lyme and Staffordshire Moorlands.

Media

Television 

The West Midlands region of the BBC is based at the Mailbox in Birmingham. From there, the regional programme Midlands Today is produced, as well as the BBC'S flagship daytime series Doctors. ITV Central broadcasts from Birmingham, off Broad Street on Gas Street next to the Worcester and Birmingham Canal, with its ITV News Central regional programme.

Some northern parts of the region, including Biddulph, receive BBC North West Tonight and Granada Reports both of which are based at MediaCityUK in Salford and are broadcast from the Winter Hill transmitter.

The BBC has its engineering training centre at Wood Norton, Worcestershire, off the A44 north of Evesham in Norton and Lenchwick. BBC English Regions is based at Birmingham.

Radio

BBC Local Radio 
The West Midlands is served by numerous BBC Local Radio stations, including BBC Radio WM, BBC CWR, BBC Radio Stoke, BBC Hereford & Worcester and BBC Radio Shropshire.

Commercial radio 
Commercial radio stations include Free Radio, Capital Midlands, Capital Mid-Counties, Heart West Midlands, Smooth West Midlands, Absolute Radio, Greatest Hits Radio, Sunshine 855 and Sunshine Radio Herefordshire & Monmouthshire.

Community Radio 

Community radio stations include:
 The Bridge 102.5 (Stourbridge)
 Radio Wyvern (Worcester) 
 Big City Radio (Birmingham) 
 Radio Plus and Hillz FM in (Coventry) 
 WCR FM and Gorgeous Radio (Wolverhampton) 
 Moorlands Radio (Leek) 
 6 Towns Radio and Cross Rhythms City Radio (Stoke-on-Trent) 
 The Hitmix (Newcastle-under-Lyme) 
 Cannock Chase Radio and Stafford FM (Stafford)

Stafford is also notable for Windmill Broadcasting, the UK's only radio station based in a Windmill, in the Broad Eye Windmill.

Newspapers 
Local newspapers include:
 Berrow's Worcester Journal
 Birmingham Mail
 Birmingham Post
 Burton Mail
 Coventry Telegraph
 Express & Star (Wolverhampton)
 Nuneaton News
 Shropshire Star
 The Sentinel (Stoke-on-Trent)
 The Shuttle (Kidderminster based, reporting on Wyre Forest news, Worcestershire)
 Worcester News

Magazines
William Gibbons of Wolverhampton prints New Scientist, The Lady, Farmers Weekly, BBC Focus, Psychologies, History Revealed, Classic Rock, and Tractors & Machinery.

The Polestar Varnicoat works on the A44 in Pinvin, north of Pershore, for many years printed Woman's Own, Heat, Pick Me Up, Chat, and That's Life.

Online 
Channel 4's 4Talent network has a hub in the West Midlands dealing with rising media talent from the region.

Sport

The National Sports Centre at Lilleshall Hall is in Sheriffhales, Shropshire, north-east of Telford; it was largely established by the Central Council of Physical Recreation in 1949 as a National Recreation Centre; the south of England had theirs at Bisham Abbey on the Thames. St George's Park National Football Centre is at Tatenhill near Byrkley Park in Needwood Forest, near former the RAF Tatenhill off the A515, four miles west of Burton upon Trent.

The Tough Guy Competition, now a widespread sport competition in the US, began in 1987 on a farm at Perton in Staffordshire. The main British athletics championships are held in Birmingham in late June. The Olympic Movement started at Much Wenlock, and also to the east of region, where Baron de Coubertin formulated his ideas for sport and the Olympics at Rugby School in 1883, with the headmaster Thomas Arnold, whose son would be the famous poet Matthew Arnold and whose great-grandson would be Aldous Huxley.

Football

Rugby
In rugby union, the region is home to professional Premiership teams Wasps RFC and Worcester Warriors. In rugby league, Midlands Hurricanes play in the third tier League 1.

Tennis

Britain's first tennis club was founded in 1872 in Leamington Spa. The modern rules of lawn tennis were developed in 1874 by Leamington Tennis Club. Tennis was pioneered in Edgbaston in 1859, and Edgbaston Archery and Lawn Tennis Society also claims to be the oldest tennis club in the world, where tennis was invented by Major Harry Gem and the Spaniard Augurio Perera.

Motor sport
Team Dynamics at Pershore, has won the British Touring Car Championship.

Notes

References

Further reading
 Bennett, Michael J. "Sir Gawain and the green knight and the literary achievement of the north-west Midlands: the historical background." Journal of Medieval History 5.1 (1979): 63–88.
 Betteridge, Alan. Deep Roots, Living Branches: A History of Baptists in the English Western Midlands (Troubador Publishing Ltd, 2010).
 Donnelly, Tom, Jason Begley, and Clive Collis. "The West Midlands automotive industry: the road downhill." Business History 59.1 (2017): 56–74 online.
 Finberg, H.P.R. The early charters of the West Midlands (Leicester University Press, 1972).
 Gelling, Margaret. The West Midlands in the Early Middle Ages (Leicester UP, 1992).
 Hilton, R. H. A Medieval Society: The West Midlands at the End of the Thirteenth Century (1987) online review
 Jones, Peter M. Industrial Enlightenment: Science, technology and culture in Birmingham and the West Midlands, 1760–1820 (2017) online.
 Money, John. Experience and Identity: Birmingham and the West Midlands, 1760–1800 (Manchester University Press, 1977).
 Money, John. "Birmingham and the West Midlands, 1760–1793: Politics and Regional Identity in the English Provinces in the Later Eighteenth Century." Midland History 1.1 (1971): 1–19.
 Rowlands, Marie B. The West Midlands from AD 1000 (3 vol, Longman, 1987).
 Somerset, Alan. "New Historicism: Old History Writ Large? Carnival, Festivity and Popular Culture in the West Midlands." Medieval & Renaissance Drama in England 5 (1991): 245–255. online

External links

 Advantage West Midlands – Regional Development Agency
 Government Office for the West Midlands
 West Midlands Regional Assembly
 Government's list of councils in the West Midlands
 MLA West Midlands – Museums, Libraries and Archives Regional Agency
 NHS West Midlands – The regional strategic health authority for the West Midlands
 Black Country Living Museum, which tells the history of the modern West Midlands areas of Dudley, Sandwell, Walsall and Wolverhampton
 The Manor of Hunningham

 
Regions of England
NUTS 1 statistical regions of England
NUTS 1 statistical regions of the European Union